The following are the football (soccer) events of the year 1946 throughout the world.

Events
League and Cup competitions resume in the United Kingdom for the first time since the start of the Second World War in 1939.

 November 13 – Walter Winterbottom makes his debut as the manager of England.

National leagues winners
 : San Lorenzo de Almagro
 : Rapid Wien
 : Audax Italiano
 : La Libertad
 : Sheffield United - North Division, Birmingham City - South Division
 : Lille
 : Újpest FC
 : Fram
 : Torino
 : Veracruz
 : Sevilla
 : IFK Norrköping
 : Servette FC
 : Fenerbahçe, Gençlerbirliği
 : Nacional
 : CSKA Moscow

Domestic cups winners
 : Boca Juniors (Copa Británica)
 : Rapid Wien (Austrian Cup)
 : Derby County (FA Cup)
 : Lille (Coupe de France)
 : Atlas (Copa México)
 : Real Madrid (Copa del Rey)
 : Malmö (Svenska Cupen)
 : Grasshoppers (Swiss Cup)
 : Spartak Moscow (Soviet Cup)

Births 
 January 26 – Mansour Pourheidari, Iranian international footballer, coach and manager (died 2016)
 February 2 – Gerrie Mühren, Dutch international footballer (died 2013)
 February 17 – Tahar Chaïbi, Tunisian international footballer (died 2014)
 February 22 – Kresten Bjerre, Danish international footballer (died 2014)
 April 3 – Pedro García Barros, Chilean footballer and manager
 May 22 – George Best, Northern Ireland international footballer (died 2005)
 May 29 – Héctor Yazalde, Argentinian footballer (died 1997)
 June 18 – Ray Treacy, Irish international footballer (died 2015)
 July 1 – Slobodan Santrač, Yugoslavian international footballer and manager (died 2016)
 August 27 –  Carlos Veglio, Argentine international footballer
 September 3 – Dirceu Lopes, Brazilian international footballer
 September 11 – John Roberts, Welsh international footballer (died 2016)
 September 18 – Joel Camargo, Brazilian international footballer (died 2014)

 
Association football by year